Algirdas Klimaitis (1910 in Kaunas – 29 August 1988 in Hamburg) was a Lithuanian  paramilitary commander, infamous for his role in the Kaunas pogrom in June 1941. It is likely that Klimaitis was an officer in the Lithuanian Army. During the pre-war years he was editor of the tabloid  (Ten Cents). His attitudes shifted to anti-communism and anti-semitism. He joined the Voldemarininkai movement.

When Nazi Germany occupied Lithuania in June 1941, at the start of Operation Barbarossa, Klimaitis formed a military unit of roughly 600 members, which was not subordinate to the Lithuanian Activist Front or the Provisional Government of Lithuania, and engaged in firefights with the Soviet army for the control of Kaunas. On the evening of 23 June, most of the city was in the hands of the insurgents.

On the night of 25–26 June, Kaunas pogrom led by Klimaitis' unit was instigated by Franz Walter Stahlecker, commanding officer of Einsatzgruppe A. By 28 June 1941, according to Stahlecker, 3,800 people had been killed in Kaunas and a further 1,200 in surrounding towns in the region. Klimaitis' men destroyed several synagogues and about sixty Jewish houses. Modern sources claim that the number of victims in Stahlecker's report were probably exaggerated. Murder of Slobodka's Rabbi, Rav Zalman Osovsky, is attributed to Jonas Klimaitis's gang.

After the war, Klimaitis moved to Hamburg, Germany, where he was discovered in the late 1970s. Hamburg Police launched an investigation, but Klimaitis died before the case could be brought to trial. He died in 1988.

See also
Lithuanian collaboration with Nazi Germany

Notes

References 

1910 births
1988 deaths
Military personnel from Kaunas
People from Kovno Governorate
Lithuanian collaborators with Nazi Germany
Holocaust perpetrators in Lithuania